Pentameroceras is a straight to slightly exogastric breviconic oncocerid from the middle Silurian of North America and Europe belonging to the Trimeroceratidae.

This nautiloid cephalopod produced a straight to slightly exogastric shell with a variable cross section that is generally circular, in which septa are close spaced and transverse, the body chamber is inflated.  The aperture, which is constricted, consists of a narrow, vertical slit-like opening extending from the ventral hyponomic sinus to a dorsal sinus and two pairs of lateral sinuses that diverge in the upper portion. Siphuncles in the Trimeroceratidae are slender and empty.

References 

 Sweet  W.C. 1964. Nautiloidea-Oncocerida. Treatise on Invertebrate Paleontology, Part K. Geological Society of America and Univ. of Kansas press. Teichert & Moore, (eds)
  Pentameroceras- Paleobio db

Prehistoric nautiloid genera
Oncocerida